Aspidosperma macrocarpon is a timber tree native to Brazil, Venezuela, Bolivia, Paraguay, and Peru. It is common in Cerrado vegetation. It has a self-supporting growth form with simple, broad leaves. This plant is cited in Flora Brasiliensis by Carl Friedrich Philipp von Martius, and it is useful for beekeeping. Individual plants can grow up to 25 m.

References

External links
 Flora Brasiliensis: Aspidosperma macrocarpum

macrocarpon
Plants described in 1824
Trees of Peru
Trees of Brazil
Trees of Bolivia
Trees of Paraguay
Trees of Venezuela